Greetje Kauffeld (born 26 November 1939) is a Dutch jazz singer and Schlager musician.

Biography
Greetje Kauffeld was born in Rotterdam. As a child she sang hits by popular American singers and participated in school choir. When she was thirteen, she sang in a band for a Radio Hilversum competition. Later, the family moved to Zeeland. At sixteen, she was lead singer of the Skymasters, a popular band which performed on radio and in concert tours. Since the orchestra also accompanied Evelyn Künneke, René Carol, Rudi Schuricke and Fred Bertelmann, she came into contact with pop stars of the time. At the Festival della Canzone in Venice, :de:Erwin Lehn invited the band to perform at his radio station, the South German Radio in Stuttgart. He made several recordings with her.

In 1961 :de:Heinz Gietz heard her singing during a performance in the Stuttgart Liederhalle and gave her a record contract. She also played in the German television series Game with Fours. In 1961 several tracks were recorded without success. She collaborated with Paul Kuhn. "Every Day I Love You a little Bit More"  was the most successful. She was also successful in her home country, the Netherlands. In 1961 she represented the Netherlands at the EuroVision Song Contest singing "Wat een dag"  ("What a Day") and finished in tenth place. In 1963 she sang "Nur bei dir" ("Only with You") at the German Schlager Festival in Baden-Baden but failed to qualify for the final. In 1964 she released "We Can Only Write Letters". The song remained for weeks in the charts.

After her contract expired in 1967, she performed in Los Angeles but returned soon after to Europe. In 1970 she married Joop de Roo, who advised her to change her music genre. She switched to jazz and was successful in the Netherlands and later in Germany. She has appeared with jazz musicians and in 1981 recorded a jazz album. In 1980 she was recognized as the best soloist at the Euro-American Nordring radio festival.

In 1986 Kauffeld had her own jazz trio accompanied by tenor saxophone and guitar. The trio received several jazz awards, including the ":nl:Gouden Notenkraker" and the Jazz Prize of den Hertogenbosch city. In addition, she became a lecturer at the HKU University of the Arts Utrecht in Hilversum, where she mentored young jazz musicians, including :de:Pit Witt.

Since 1993 she has performed in Germany, especially with the Siggi Gerhard-Swingtett, and as guest at many gigs. In 2002, she performed with jazz pianist :de:Dirk Raufeisen in the program "A Lovely Way to Spend at Evening". In 2005 she began a collaboration with the Swingin' Fireballs from Bremen. This resulted in a Christmas album that was released by Mons Records in 2006.

In 2006 her memoir Was für Tage... (What for Days) was published by German journalist Ingo Schiweck. In celebration of her 75th birthday in 2014, this book was updated.

In 1999 Kauffeld was honored with the Ridder in De Orde van de Nederlandse Leeuw (Order of the Netherlands Lion). In November 2014 she was awarded an Edison Jazz Oeuvre prize. This was presented to her by :nl:Joke Bruijs during the Dutch television program Tijd voor MAX (Time for MAX).

Success titles 

Ruf an 1961
Nur eine schlechte Kopie 1961
Sunday Melody 1963
Jeden Tag, da lieb ich dich ein kleines bisschen mehr 1963 (with Paul Kuhn)
Wir können uns nur Briefe schreiben 1964
Tanz bitte noch einmal mit mir 1966
The Song Is You 1988
Greetje Kauffeld Meets Alan & Marilyn Bergman 1989
Greetje Kauffeld Meets Jerry von Rooijen et al. 1997
My Favorite Ballads 1997
Dreaming 2000
My Shining Hour 2005

Discography

References

External links
Greetje Kauffeld's website

1939 births
Living people
Eurovision Song Contest entrants for the Netherlands
Dutch women singers
Dutch jazz singers
Eurovision Song Contest entrants of 1961
Musicians from Rotterdam
Nationaal Songfestival contestants